Craigsville can refer to a location in the United States:

Craigsville, Minnesota
Craigsville, Virginia
Craigsville, West Virginia